John Devereux of Bodenham and Decies was an Anglo-Norman nobleman living during the reigns of King John and Henry III of England. The Devereux were a prominent knightly family along the Welsh Marches during the thirteenth century, and John Devereux was a key member of the retinue of Richard Marshal, 3rd Earl of Pembroke, and companion of Walter III de Clifford, Baron of Clifford.

Ancestry

John Devereux was born about 1193, the son of Walter Devereux and Cecilia de Longchamp. His father was a member of the retinue of William de Braose, 4th Lord of Bramber, and upon Walter's death about 1197 his estates were taken into de Braose's hands for the king. Walter Devereux's sons were fostered for training as knights: John Devereux with William de Braose, 4th Lord of Bramber; Stephen Devereux,  with William Marshal, 1st Earl of Pembroke; and Nicholas Devereux, with Walter de Lacy, Lord of Meath. The three brothers would sire the three Devereux families that would play an integral role in controlling the Welsh Marches during the thirteenth century.

Career

John Devereux joined the retinue of William de Braose about 1200 as de Braose expanded his holdings in Wales, and reclaimed his family's rights in Limerick, Ireland. On 2 April 1203 the King ordered 'William de Patell' (William de Preaux) to grant the lands in France held in the King's hands (and possession of Lodovic Luvet de Fontenum) to Cecilia Devereux as guardian of the heir, John. Cecilia was identified as the daughter(-in-law) of John, Lord Devereux, who was the grandfather of the said heir, John. The grant was witnessed by William de Braose.

During the summer of 1208 King John used de Braose's escalating debt and refusal to provide a hostage, to seize his lands and order the arrest of his family. In early 1209 William de Braose fled to Ireland, and King John pursued him ultimately to his death. Braose's supporters such as John Devereux, and any providing him aid including William Marshal, the earl of Pembroke, were the subjects of royal disfavor. At this time the guardianship and training as a knight of John Devereux was assumed by William Marshal, and this led to John joining his brother, Stephen Devereux, in the service of the earl of Pembroke.

In the summer of 1211 a Welsh rebellion forced King John to redirect his attention to its suppression. His forces were further strained by the discovery of a plot to usurp the throne. William Marshal seized this opportunity to regain favor with a show of support, and King John restored the Marshal's men and lands in Wales to counter the rebellion. In April 1213 the Marshal gathered his forces, probably including both Devereux, to bolster King John's forces in Kent to counter a possible French invasion. In 1214 the King's expedition to Poitou fails, and in autumn unrest swept England. William Marshal becomes key to the negotiations for the Magna Carta, and John Devereux was probably with him on 15 June 1215 when Marshal stood with King John at Runnymede. After the Pope declared the Magna Carta void, the First Barons' War broke out. In autumn John Devereux again is probably with the earl of Pembroke defending the marches from Welsh incursions. Over the next year England fell into civil war with a French invasion and occupation of London. When King John died on 18 October 1216, John Devereux was probably among the earl's forces that secured Henry III and crowned him king. As the opposing forces maneuvered, Devereux remained with William Marshal as he brought his forces to crush the baronial faction on 20 May 1217 at the Battle of Lincoln.

As reward for his faithful service John Devereux was knighted about 1218, and granted approximately 4800 acres of land. The lands were enfeoffed for 2 knights’ fees to the earl of Pembroke through his loyal retainer, Thomas fitzAnthony.  Devereux received lands in the Decies (Kilkenny, Ireland) along the river Nore encompassing Donoughmore. These included the ancient parish of Achteyr (alias Aharney), and was part of the barony of Fertagh. The grant ran from Lazhargalvan up to Mezhan, and as the water of Avenmore runs to Dufglas, and along the water of Dufglas to the nearest ford of Leichemaelergin; and as those said lands extend in Slefto to Sleftrun, that is to say Anach and Seunach, Killorzhie, Adentein, Crumachtan, Sheskin, Balinoe, Razhinakennardy, Baliachan, Affane, Ballymalaly, Balimithyan, Balykennedy, Ballydonan, Cappagh, Ross, Caselan, Kilcounan, Moy, Thelghy, Tholach, Henan, and Kulman.  Further grant also of Galles and Ballybrenning, Ardoe and Lislaan, Culbethach and the fourth part of Balymachethy on the east and south. These lands were held for an annual rent of 31 marks (20 pounds) to the king, and were quit of the maintenance of archers therein. William Marshal died on 14 May 1219, and John Devereux joined the retinue of William fitzWilliam Marshal, 2nd earl of Pembroke. Following the 1st earl's death his retainer fitzAnthony's influence waned in Ireland in favor of the rising power of Hubert de Burgh and Richard de Burgh.

About 1223 John Devereux witnessed the charter of his brother, Stephen Devereux, who made extensive grants to Wormsley Priory (Old Church of Saint Leonard). This deed also confirmed the grants of their father, Walter Devereux; made mention of their mother, the widow Cecilia; and was acknowledged by Gilbert de Lacy.

In 1223 the 2nd earl of Pembroke crossed over to Wales to campaign against Llywelyn, and Devereux probably came with him. In his absence the Justiciar of Ireland was ordered to take fitzAnthony's lands into hand as he was accused of detaining some of the King's escheats. During 1224 Hugh de Lacy, 1st Earl of Ulster attacked the lands held by the 2nd earl of Pembroke, and other royal demesne lands. The earl returned to Ireland and subdued de Lacy. He served as Justiciar of Ireland from 1224 to 1226. In 1225 John Devereux recovered his lands by payment of 250 marks to the King. About 1225 Devereux witnessed the granting of a license by Walter Clifford for 1 mark to the monks of Salop for the grazing of their goats in the woodland of Lawton. Richard de Burgh regained the position of Justiciar in 1226, and by December Devereux's lands were again placed in his custody probably for being among those said to be holding their castles ‘against the king’ in August 1226. Henry III assumed full regal powers in January 1227, and by April 1227 Thomas fitzAnthony had died. FitzAnthony's lands were taken into the King's hands in August, and these included those enfeoffed by John Devereux. Henry III attained legal majority in October 1228, and the 2nd earl of Pembroke regained royal favor. In early 1229 John Devereux was instructed to pay a fine of £10 to the king to have a charter granting his holdings in the Decies, which he had previously held of Thomas fitzAnthony as a tenant-in-chief of the king.  On 25 March 1229 the King confirmed the:

Gift to John de Ebroicis, and his heirs, of lands in Dessyo, … all which lands the said John previously held of the gift of Thomas son of Anthony; to hold, with all appurtenances, rendering 31 marks to the king yearly; grant also to the same of free warren in the said lands, and that he and his heirs be quit of the maintenance of archers therein

William fitzWilliam Marshal, 2nd earl of Pembroke witnessed this charter. On 2 April 1229 Richard de Burgh, justiciary of Ireland, acknowledged receipt of the 10 pounds at the Dublin Exchequer.

Devereux witnessed two grants of Walter de Lacy. In 1230 Sir John Devereux also witnessed the grant by Walter Clifford, son of Walter Clifford and Agnes Cundy, to Katherine, daughter of Walter de Lacy, of Burley held as part of the manor of Corfham. That same year the 2nd earl of Pembroke accompanied King Henry III on an expedition to Brittany, and John Devereux was probably in his retinue. On 6 April 1231 the 2nd earl died, and was succeeded by Richard Marshal as 3rd earl of Pembroke who became leader of the baronial party antagonistic to Henry III's foreign friends.

In 1232 John Devereux was identified in the royal book of fines as paying the 20 pounds required by law.  The refusal of the Justiciars of Ireland to implement certain royal orders, though, caused John to still be seeking seisin of his lands in the Decies in 1233. On 27 April 1233 the king commanded that he be granted full seisin of his lands. A portion of his lands had been retained by Richard de Burgh when Justiciar. It was this disseisin which the King referred to in his letter to  Maurice fitzGelrald, Justiciar of Ireland, on 8 August 1233 instructing him to give seisin of the lands that the King had disseised John, and which he had subsequently granted to him by charter. Specifically, the lands included Galles, Bellibrannyn, Arda, Lisnaan, Gurbetha, and Culma.

In mid-June 1233 Henry III took hostages from a powerful group of marchers including Walter de Lacey, Henry Audley, John Lestrange, Thomas Corbet, and Ralph Mortimer.  Some suggest this was intended to restrain them from supporting Richard Marshal, but it probably was aimed at keeping them from breaking a current truce with Llywelyn. John Devereux was among these  marchers, and he was required to pledge his lands as security and send his heir, Walter Devereux, as hostage on 17 June 1233. In August 1233 revolt broke out along the Marches led by Richard Marshal, earl of Pembroke, and Walter de Clifford, Marcher Lord. The king declared Marshal a traitor when he refused to present himself at Gloucester. John Devereux was among the knights who initially supported the revolt, but soon returned to Henry III. On 17 August Devereux, William Mauduit (Lord of Hanslope), and Mathew Maung were issued charters that contained an oath of allegiance they had to make vowing forfeiture of their lands should they not serve Henry III faithfully. Furthermore, Walter, son of John Devereux, was to be released from the custody of Hugh de Kilpeck where he had been held as security for Devereux and Maung, and William de Dunre was to guarantee his fidelity by providing his son to William fitzWarin as hostage. In March 1234 the king entered a temporary truce with Richard Marshal, but conflict broke out in Ireland between Richard's brothers and the king's supporters. After allying with Llywelyn, prince of Wales, Richard crossed from Wales to Ireland, and on 16 April 1234 he died from wounds suffered at the Battle of the Curragh. Gilbert Marshal succeeded him as the 4th earl of Pembroke.

On 10 September 1234 the king instructed Maurice fitzGerald, justiciary of Ireland, to investigate the complaint of Geoffrey de Turville, Archdeacon of Dublin, that John Devereux, William of Wales, and others were placing clerks in the chapels on their lands, and that the right of appointment to these chapels belonged to the Archdeacon.

On 24 Aug. 1236 Henry III pardoned Richard fitzElias £20 of the issues of the land of John Devereux granted to him in compensation for the damage that he sustained in the war between the king and Richard Marshal, earl of Pembroke. Maurice fitzGerald, Justiciar of Ireland, and Geoffrey de Turville, Archdeacon of Dublin and treasurer, were instructed that Richard was to be quit from the issues due to be received at the Dublin Exchequer.

On 8 June 1237 Fulk fitzWarin attorned before the king, John Devereux, and Richard de Rocheford in the matter of an assise de morte d’ancestor, which Fulk claimed against John Travers and Hugh Purcell for the land in Docoinell Glencaveran. About 1244 John Devereux granted to his son, Vincent de Ebroicis, and his heirs his remaining five carucates (600 acres) of land in Ireland representing the fourth part of a knight's service of the fee of Donoughmore, barony of Fertagh. The fee extends between the Cullahill Mountains to the east of side of the river Nore at Ballyragget, and borders on the southwest with Philip de Rocheford's lands in the parish of Sheffin, and on the south with the monks of Jerpoint in Grangemacomb. It also possessed the common of pasture and woods in Odogh. It was witnessed by two of his other sons: Richard Devereux, and Warin Devereux. Donoughmore lies on the east side of the river Nore at Ballyragget with the fee of Donoughmore extending along the west bank, and the five carucates taking in the ancient parish of Achteyr alias Aharney.

In the 1240s there is a reference to a release by Robert de Wilmeston, son of Roger de Chandos (Lord of Snodhill), to the monks of Dore of all the land upon the Godway (Blakemere) in Hereford, which the said monks held from Sir John Devereux, from the upper part of Wadel (tributary of the river Lugg) to the boundaries of Malfeld (in Peterchurch) and Isaacsfeld (abutting on a meadow called 'Wetemore). The land extended to the combe of Wilmeston, and part abutted on Titekmille and extended to Hyldithelee. This document was witnessed by his son, Sir Walter Devereux among others.

John Devereux witnessed the grant of Isabel de Cantilupe, widow of his brother Stephen Devereux, on 21 February 1244 to the Hospital of St. Ethelbert for the souls of herself and her two husbands "unam ladum bladi" at the Feast of St. Andrew during her life to be received at her house in Frome. This Deed has a seal of white wax with the arms of Devereux and around it "Sigillum Isabell +" and was also witnessed by Hugh de Kilpeck, and Ricard de Chandos. The arms of Devereux were described as "a fess and in chief three torteauxes."

Marriage

John Devereux married Lady Alice de Hereford, daughter of Thomas of Hereford and Beatrice Butler. Beatrice Butler was the daughter of Theobald Walter, 1st Baron Butler. They had children:

Walter Devereux
Vincent Devereux
Warin Devereux
Richard Devereux

Landholdings

John Devereux inherited the manor of Bodenham Devereux, and lands in Wirkebroc (Peterchurch) and Westhide in the county of Herefordshire. John held lands in Bredwardine and Bodenham of the Honor of Brecon. He acquired during his lifetime lands in the Decies, Ireland; and Hardel (Southampton).

Death

John Devereux died between February 1244 and September 1245.  On 29 September 1245 his son, Walter Devereux, was granted respite from a demand of payment by Hamo of Hereford (a Jewish money lender) of a debt of 12 ½ marks owed by his father, John Devereux.

Notes

General References

Asbridge, Thomas. The Greatest Knight. (New York: HarperCollins, 2014)
 Holden, Brock. "Lords of the Central Marches: English Aristocracy and Frontier Society, 1087-1265." (Oxford: Oxford University Press, 2008).
 Redmond, Gabriel O'C. "An Account of the Anglo-Norman Family of Devereux, of Balmagir, County Wexford." (Dublin: Office of "The Irish Builder," 1891). 
 Robinson, Charles J. A History of the Castles of Herefordshire and their Lords. (Great Britain; Antony Rowe LTD, 2002). Page 125-129
Roche, Richard. The Norman Invasion of Ireland. (Dublin; Anvil Books, 1995)

Specific References

Anglo-Normans
Norman warriors
1193 births
John
1240s deaths
13th-century English people